The Fruit of the Holy Spirit (sometimes, incorrectly, referred to as the Fruits of the Holy Spirit) is a biblical term that sums up nine attributes of a person or community living in accord with the Holy Spirit, according to chapter 5 of the Epistle to the Galatians: "But the fruit of the Spirit is love, joy, peace, patience, kindness, goodness, faithfulness, gentleness, and self-control." The fruit is contrasted with the works of the flesh which immediately precede it in this chapter.

The Catholic Church follows the Latin Vulgate version of Galatians in recognizing twelve attributes of the Fruit: charity (caritas), joy (gaudium), peace (pax), patience (patientia), benignity (benignitas), goodness (bonitas), longanimity (longanimitas), mildness (mansuetudo), faith (fides), modesty (modestia), continency (continentia), and chastity (castitas). This tradition was defended by Thomas Aquinas in his work Summa Theologica, and reinforced in numerous Catholic catechisms, including the Baltimore Catechism, the Penny Catechism, and the Catechism of the Catholic Church.

Early commentary
Aquinas pointed out that numbered among the attributes of the Fruit of the Holy Spirit are certain virtues, such as charity, meekness, faith, chastity, and kindness. Augustine defined virtue as "a good habit consonant with our nature."

Though often discussed as nine attributes of the Fruit of the Spirit, the original Greek term translated as "fruit" is singular. Aquinas explained, "Consequently fruit is mentioned there in the singular, on account of its being generically one, though divided into many species which are spoken of as so many fruits." Augustine's commentary on Galatians 5:25-26 says, "the Apostle had no intention of teaching us how many [either works of the flesh, or fruit of the Spirit] there are; but to show how the former should be avoided, and the latter sought after."

Definitions

Unconditional Benevolence (Love, Greek: agape, Latin: caritas)

Agape (love) denotes an undefeatable benevolence and unconquerable goodwill that always seeks the highest good for others, no matter their behavior. It is a  love that gives freely without asking anything in return and does not consider the worth of its object.  Agape is more a love by choice than Philos, which is love by chance; and it refers to the will rather than the emotion.  Agape describes the unconditional love God has for the world. Paul describes love in 1 Corinthians 13:4–8:

According to Strong's Greek Lexicon, the word ἀγάπη [G26] (Transliteration: agapē) means love, i.e. affection or benevolence; especially (plural) a love feast:—(feast of) charity(-ably), dear, love.

 Pronunciation: ag-ah'-pay 
 Part of Speech: feminine noun
 Root Word (Etymology): From ἀγαπάω (G25)

Outline of Biblical Usage:
 affection, goodwill, love, benevolence, brotherly love
 love feasts
	
The Greek word ἀγάπη (agapē) occurs 117 times in 106 verses in the Greek concordance of the NASB.

Joy In God (Joy, Greek: chara, Latin: gaudium)
The joy referred to here is deeper than mere happiness; it is rooted in God and comes from Him. Since it comes from God, it is more serene and stable than worldly happiness, which is merely emotional and lasts only for a time.

According to Strong's Greek Lexicon, the Greek word listed in the verse is χαρά (G5479), meaning 'joy', 'gladness', or a source of joy'. The Greek χαρά (chara) occurs 59 times in 57 verses in the Greek concordance of the NASB.
 Original Word: χαρά, ᾶς, ἡ  From χαίρω (G5463)
 Part of Speech: Noun, Feminine
 Transliteration: chara
 Phonetic Spelling: (Khar-ah')

Joy (Noun and Verb), Joyfulness, Joyfully, Joyous:
"joy, delight" (akin to chairs, "to rejoice"), is found frequently in Matthew and Luke, and especially in John, once in Mark (Mar 4:16, RV, "joy," AV, "gladness"); it is absent from 1 Cor. (though the verb is used three times), but is frequent in 2 Cor., where the noun is used five times (for 2Cr 7:4, RV, see Note below), and the verb eight times, suggestive of the Apostle's relief in comparison with the circumstances of the 1st Epistle; in Col 1:11, AV, "joyfulness," RV, "joy." The word is sometimes used, by metonymy, of the occasion or cause of "joy," Luk 2:10 (lit., "I announce to you a great joy"); in 2Cr 1:15, in some mss., for charis, "benefit;" Phl 4:1, where the readers are called the Apostle's "joy;" so 1Th 2:19, 20; Hbr 12:2, of the object of Christ's "joy;" Jam 1:2, where it is connected with falling into trials; perhaps also in Mat 25:21, 23, where some regard it as signifying, concretely, the circumstances attending cooperation in the authority of the Lord.

Note: In Hbr 12:11, "joyous" represents the phrase meta, "with," followed by chara, lit., "with joy." So in Hbr 10:34, "joyfully;" in 2Cr 7:4 the noun is used with the Middle Voice of huperperisseuo, "to abound more exceedingly," and translated "(I overflow) with joy," RV (AV, "I am exceeding joyful").

Contentedness In All Circumstances (Peace, Greek: eirene, Latin: pax)
The Greek word εἰρήνη (Strong's G1515)(eirēnē)(transliteration: i-ray'-nay), probably derived from a primary verb εἴρω eírō (to join), means peace (literally or figuratively); by implication, prosperity:—one, peace, quietness, rest, + set at one again.

<blockquote>The word "peace" comes from the Greek word eirene, the Greek equivalent for the Hebrew word shalom, which expresses the idea of wholeness, completeness, or tranquility in the soul that is unaffected by the outward circumstances or pressures.  The word eirene strongly suggests the rule of order in place of chaos.</blockquote>

The Greek εἰρήνη (eirēnē) occurs 92 times in 86 verses in the Greek concordance of the KJV. The KJV translates Strong's G1515 in the following manner: peace (89x), one (1x), rest (1x), quietness (1x). The outline of Biblical usage is as follows:
 a state of national tranquillity
 exemption from the rage and havoc of war
 peace between individuals, i.e. harmony, concord
 security, safety, prosperity, felicity, (because peace and harmony make and keep things safe and prosperous)
 of the Messiah's peace
 the way that leads to peace (salvation)
 of Christianity, the tranquil state of a soul assured of its salvation through Christ, and so fearing nothing from God and content with its earthly lot, of whatsoever sort that is
 the blessed state of devout and upright men after death

Jesus is described as the Prince of Peace, who brings peace to the hearts of those who desire it.  He says in John 14:27: "Peace I leave with you, My peace I give to you; not as the world gives do I give to you. Let not your heart be troubled, neither let it be afraid". In Matthew 5:9 he says, "Blessed are the peacemakers, for they will be called sons of God."

Refusing To Avenge Oneself (Patience, Greek: makrothumia, Latin: longanimitas)

Generally the Greek world applied this word to a man who could avenge himself but did not. This word is often used in the Greek Scriptures in reference to God and God's attitude to humans. Exodus 34:6 describes the Lord as "slow to anger and rich in kindness and fidelity."

Patience, which in some translations is "longsuffering" or "endurance", is defined in Strong's by two Greek words, makrothumia and hupomone.The first, pronounced (mak-roth-oo-mee-ah) comes from makros, "long", and thumos, "temper".  The word denotes lenience, forbearance, fortitude, patient endurance, longsuffering.  Also included in makrothumia is the ability to endure persecution and ill-treatment.  It describes a person who has the power to exercise revenge but instead exercises restraint. (Strong's #3115)
The latter, hupomone, (hoop-om-on-ay) is translated "endurance": Constancy, perseverance, continuance, bearing up, steadfastness, holding out, patient endurance.  The word combines hupo, "under", and mone, "to remain".  It describes the capacity to continue to bear up under difficult circumstances, not with a passive complacency, but with a hopeful fortitude that actively resists weariness and defeat, (Strong's #5281) with hupomone (Greek ὑπομονή) being further understood as that which would be "as opposed to cowardice or despondency"

"With lowliness and meekness, with longsuffering, forbearing one another in love".

Repaying Evil With Good (Kindness, Greek: chrestotes, Latin: benignitas)

In Greek, old wine was called "chrestos" which meant that it was mellow or smooth. Christ used this word in Matthew 11:30, "For my yoke is easy, and my burden light."

Kindness is acting for the good of people regardless of what they do, properly, "useable, i.e. well-fit for use (for what is really needed); kindness that is also serviceable".
Strong's #5544: Kindness is goodness in action, sweetness of disposition, gentleness in dealing with others, benevolence, kindness, affability.  The word describes the ability to act for the welfare of those taxing your patience.  The Holy Spirit removes abrasive qualities from the character of one under His control. (emphasis added)

The word kindness comes from the Greek word chrestotes (khray-stot-ace), which meant to show kindness or to be friendly to others and often depicted rulers, governors, or people who were kind, mild, and benevolent to their subjects.  Anyone who demonstrated this quality of chrestotes was considered to be compassionate, considerate, sympathetic, humane, kind, or gentle.  The apostle Paul uses this word to depict God's incomprehensible kindness for people who are unsaved (see Romans 11:22; Ephesians 2:7; Titus 3:4).

One scholar has noted that when the word chrestotes is applied to interpersonal relationships, it conveys the idea of being adaptable to others.  Rather than harshly require everyone else to adapt to his own needs and desires, when  chrestotes is working in a believer, he seeks to become adaptable to the needs of those who are around him.  (Sparkling Gems from the Greek, Rick Renner)Kindness is doing something and not expecting anything in return. Kindness is respect and helping others without waiting for someone to help one back. It implies kindness no matter what. We should live "in purity, understanding, patience and kindness; in the Holy Spirit and in sincere love; in truthful speech and in the power of God; with weapons of righteousness in the right hand and in the left".

Showing Mercy To Sinners (Goodness, Greek: agathosune, Latin: bonitas)
The state or quality of being good
Moral excellence; virtue;
Kindly feeling, kindness, generosity, joy in being good
The best part of anything; Essence; Strength;
General character recognized in quality or conduct.

Popular English Bibles (e.g. NIV, NASB, NLT) translate the single Greek word chrestotes into two English words: kindness and goodness. "Wherefore also we pray always for you, that our God would count you worthy of this calling, and fulfill all the good pleasure of his goodness, and the work of faith with power". "For the fruit of the Spirit is in all goodness and righteousness and truth", with agathosune being "found only in Biblical and ecclesiastical writings, uprightness of heart and life".

Overcoming Temptation (Faithfulness, Greek: pistis, Latin: fides)

The root of pistis ("faith") is peithô, that is to persuade or be persuaded, which supplies the core-meaning of faith as being "divine persuasion", received from God, and never generated by man. It is defined as the following: objectively, trustworthy; subjectively, trustful:—believe(-ing, -r), faithful(-ly), sure, true.

 Greek: πιστός 
 Transliteration: pistos   
 Pronunciation: pē-sto's   
 Part of Speech: adjective   
 Root Word (Etymology): From πείθω

The Greek πιστός (pistos) occurs 67 times in 62 verses in the Greek concordance of the KJV: faithful (53x), believe (6x), believing (2x), true (2x), faithfully (1x), believer (1x), sure (1x).

Outline of Biblical Usage

 trusty, faithful 
 of persons who show themselves faithful in the transaction of business, the execution of commands, or the discharge of official duties 
 one who kept his plighted faith, worthy of trust 
 that can be relied on 
 easily persuaded 
 believing, confiding, trusting 
 in the NT one who trusts in God's promises 
 one who is convinced that Jesus has been raised from the dead 
 one who has become convinced that Jesus is the Messiah and author of salvation

Examples:
"O Lord, thou art my God; I will exalt thee, I will praise thy name; for thou hast done wonderful things; thy counsels of old are faithfulness and truth". "I pray that out of his glorious riches he may strengthen you with power through his Spirit in your inner being, so that Christ may dwell in your hearts through faith".

The writer of the Letter to the Hebrews describes it this way: "Let us fix our eyes on Jesus, the author and perfecter of our faith, who for the joy set before him endured the cross, scorning its shame, and sat down at the right hand of the throne of God".

Nonviolence (Gentleness, Greek: prautes, Latin: modestia)

Gentleness, in the Greek, prautes, commonly known as meekness, is "a divinely-balanced virtue that can only operate through faith (cf.).
The New Spirit Filled Life Bible defines gentleness as "a disposition that is even-tempered, tranquil, balanced in spirit, unpretentious, and that has the passions under control. The word is best translated 'meekness,' not as an indication of weakness, but of power and strength under control. The person who possesses this quality pardons injuries, corrects faults, and rules his own spirit well".
	 	
"Brothers and sisters, if someone is caught in a sin, you who live by the Spirit should restore that person gently. But watch yourselves, or you also may be tempted".
	 	
"Be completely humble and gentle; be patient, bearing with one another in love".

Obedience Unto Death (Self-control, Greek: enkrateia, Latin: continentia)

The Greek word used in Galatians 5:23 is "enkrateia''", meaning "strong, having mastery, able to control one's thoughts and actions."

We read also: "...make every effort to add to your faith goodness; and to goodness, knowledge; and to knowledge, self-control; and to self-control, perseverance; and to perseverance, godliness; and to godliness, mutual affection; and to mutual affection, love".

See also 
 Gifts of the Holy Spirit
 Seven virtues
 Related Bible parts: Galatians 5, Philippians 4

Bibliography

Citations

Sources 
 George A. Kennedy, New Testament Interpretation Through Rhetorical Criticism, George A. Kennedy (University of North Carolina Press: 1984)
 Longman, Robert Jr. "Self-Control". Web: 19 Oct 2010. Spirit Home 
 Classic Sermons on the Fruit of the Spirit, (Warren Wiersbe ed.), Kregel Academic, 2002. 
 Hidden Fruit book , Robert Bass 2022

 
Spiritual gifts
Christian ethics in the Bible
Holy Spirit